Marta Schölerová (better known by her stage name, Suzanne Marwille; 11 July 1895 – 14 January 1962) was a Czech film actress. Marwille was born in Prague. She had four siblings, and was the daughter of Emerich Schöler and his wife Bedřiška Peceltová. By the age of 18, she married Gustav Schullenbauer.

Selected filmography
Source:
 Za svobodu národa (1920)
 Madame Golvery (1923)
 The Money Devil (1923)
 Modern Marriages (1924)
 Two Children (1924)
 Father Vojtech (1929)
 The Organist at St. Vitus' Cathedral (1929)
 Vše pro lásku (1930)
 Chudá holka (1930)
 Sister Angelika (1932)
 Pobočník Jeho Výsosti (1933)
 Hordubalové (1938)

References

External links
 

1895 births
1962 deaths
Czechoslovak film actresses
Actresses from Prague
Czech film actresses
Czech silent film actresses
20th-century Czech actresses
Martin Frič